Jinyun County is a county of south-central Zhejiang province, China. It is under the administration of the Lishui City.

Administrative divisions
Towns:
Wuyun (五云镇), Huzhen (壶镇镇), Xinjian (新建镇), Shuhong (舒洪镇), Dayuan (大源镇), Dongdu (东渡镇), Dongfang (东方镇), Dayang (大洋镇)

Townships:
Rongjiang Township (溶江乡), Qili Township (七里乡), Huyuan Township (胡源乡), Nanxi Township (南溪乡), Sanxi Township (三溪乡), Qianlu Township (前路乡), Fangxi Township (方溪乡), Shijian Township (石笕乡), Shuangxikou Township (双溪口乡)

Climate

Transportation 
Jinyun railway station is located on the Jinhua–Wenzhou railway. Jinyun West railway station is located on the Jinhua–Wenzhou high-speed railway. Huzhen railway station is located on the Jinhua–Taizhou railway.

References

 
County-level divisions of Zhejiang
Lishui